BAE173 is a South Korean boy band formed and managed by PocketDol Studio. The group debuted on November 19, 2020, with their first EP Intersection: Spark.

Name 
The name BAE173 comes from "Before Anyone Else" and the numbers 173 represent 1 as the number for perfection and 73 as a perfect lucky number. The group name is pronounced by pronouncing each letter and then the numbers 1, 7, 3.

History

Pre-debut
Prior to debut, members Hangyul and Dohyon participated in Produce X 101, where both finished in the final line up and debuted with X1. Following the disbandment of X1, Hangyul and Dohyon then went on to debut as the duo, H&D, in April of 2020.

Beginning September 5, 2020, the members were teased 3 times a week until all members were revealed. After all members were named. the group name BAE173 was announced.

2020–2021: Debut with Intersection: Spark and Intersection: Trace
BAE173 released their debut EP Intersection: Spark on November 19, 2020, with the title track "Crush on U". The group held an online showcase that was broadcast simultaneously on V Live and Youtube. Their debut music video for "Crush on U" went on to reach 10 million views in 6 days.

On November 29, the group released a follow up track meant for fans titled "Every Little Thing is You" (모두 너야). The track featured writing credits from the group's youngest member Dohyon.

In December of 2020, it was announced that BAE173 would be the cover artist of Ten Asia's Tenstar magazine and have a 24 page feature. BAE173 expressed their goals for the future and how they felt leading up to their debut.

On April 8, 2021, BAE173 released their second EP Intersection: Trace and its lead single "Loved You".

2022–present: Intersection: Blaze and Odyssey: Dash 
On March 30, 2022, BAE173 released their third EP Intersection: Blaze and its lead single "Jaws".

On May 20, 2022, BAE173 held a fan sign event at Nissho Hall in Tokyo, Japan at 12:00 p.m. on the 20th. In addition, the 2022 BAE173 Fan Meeting in Japan - Hajimete was held at 6 p.m. of the same day and at 6 p.m. on May 21 again.

On August 17, 2022, BAE173 released their fourth EP  Odyssey: Dash and its lead single "Dash".

Members
J-Min (제이민)
Hangyul (한결)
Yoojun (유준)
Muzin (무진)
Junseo (준서)
Youngseo (영서)
Doha (도하)
Bit (빛)
Dohyon (도현)

Discography

Extended plays

Singles

Videography

Music videos

Awards and nominations

References

K-pop music groups
South Korean boy bands
South Korean dance music groups
Musical groups from Seoul
Musical groups established in 2020
2020 establishments in South Korea
South Korean pop music groups
Peak Time contestants